I Feel Bad About My Neck: And Other Thoughts on Being a Woman is a 2006 book written by Nora Ephron. The book collects humor essays by Ephron, many of which deal with aging: her ups and downs dealing with the tribulations of maintenance, menopause, empty nests, and life itself. (Ephron published the collection when she was 65.) In a review for The New York Times, Janet Maslin remarks on Ephron's "wry, knowing X-ray vision."

On September 10, 2006, it was listed at #1 on The New York Times Non-Fiction Best Seller list. In 2019, the book was included at #100 on The Guardian's list of the 100 best books of the 21st century.

References

Works by Nora Ephron
2006 non-fiction books
Comedy books